The Rulo Rail Bridge is a truss bridge across the Missouri River connecting Rulo, Nebraska, with Holt County, Missouri, and is used by the BNSF Railway to transport coal from Wyoming and Colorado to Midwest power plants.

The original bridge was built in 1887. It was fabricated in England and reassembled at Rulo. In the summer of 1977 the steel truss was replaced in 48 hours when sections of the new bridge were assembled on either side of the river, then lifted onto falsework towers on barges on both sides of the up and downstream sides. The new bridge was placed on the upstream towers and the old bridge was moved to the downstream side and then new bridge was placed on the original 1887 piers. The total cost of the operation was $6.7 million.

Prior to the replacement only grain rather than coal trains could cross the bridge.

See also
List of bridges documented by the Historic American Engineering Record in Missouri
List of bridges documented by the Historic American Engineering Record in Nebraska
List of crossings of the Missouri River

References
Lincoln Star (Lincoln, Nebraska), July 7, 1977, Page 5

External links

Railroad bridges in Nebraska
Railroad bridges in Missouri
Buildings and structures in Holt County, Missouri
Buildings and structures in Richardson County, Nebraska
Bridges completed in 1887
Bridges over the Missouri River
BNSF Railway bridges
Chicago, Burlington and Quincy Railroad
Historic American Engineering Record in Missouri
Historic American Engineering Record in Nebraska
Interstate railroad bridges in the United States
Steel bridges in the United States